Richard Banda SC is a Malawian barrister and former athlete. He is a judge who formerly served as  Chief Justice of Malawi and Eswatini and as Minister of Justice in Malawi. He was president of the Commonwealth Magistrates' and Judges' Association and Commonwealth Secretariat Arbitral Tribunal. As a sportsman, Banda was a track and field athlete and soccer player. He is the spouse of the former President of Malawi, Joyce Banda and, as such, was the First Gentleman.

Career

Athletic career
He played soccer for Malawi, was the captain of the Malawi national team, the Flames, and later was president of the Football Association of Malawi. As a track and field athlete, Banda represented Malawi in the high jump. He later became the president of the Olympic and Commonwealth Games Association of Malawi.

Legal career
Banda was called to the Bar by Gray's Inn in July 1966. He then worked with the Malawi Government Legal Service until 1970. He was appointed the Director of Public Prosecution by the president of Malawi Kamuzu Banda and later served as acting Solicitor General and Secretary for Justice. In April 1972 he was appointed Attorney General and became the first Malawian to be created Senior Counsel. He worked in these two roles until 1974 when he became Minister of Justice and Attorney General and was responsible for the Portfolio of Local Government until his resignation in 1976.

In 1980, he re-entered the Judicial Service to fill the newly created office of Chief Resident Magistrate. In November 1980 he was appointed a Judge of the High Court and Supreme Court of Malawi. In 1992 Banda was appointed as the first black Chief Justice of Malawi until 2002. He was the president of the Commonwealth Magistrates' and Judges' Association (CMJA) 2000–2003.

He was the Chief Justice of Eswatini. He spoke against corruption and backlogs in the Swaziland Criminal Justice System. Banda was succeeded by Michael Ramodibedi after he retired due to his health.

Honors and awards
Chairman of African Parks (Majete), 2003–2007
President, Commonwealth Secretariat Arbitral Tribunal
President, Commonwealth Magistrates' and Judges' Association (CMJA), 2000–2003
Honorary Life Fellow, Society of Advanced Legal Studies (constituent organization of the University of London)
Honorary Master of the Bench, Gray's Inn

Personal life
Banda was born in Kawambwa, Northern Rhodesia, near the border with Nyasaland (now Malawi). He is married to Malawi's former President, Joyce Banda. He is brother-in-law to Anjimile Oponyo.

References

Chief justices of Malawi
Chief justices of Eswatini
First ladies and gentlemen of Malawi
Malawian male high jumpers
People from Kawambwa District
Living people
Malawian judges on the courts of Eswatini
Members of Gray's Inn
Attorneys-General of Malawi
Year of birth missing (living people)
20th-century Malawian judges
21st-century Malawian judges